Ibrahim Saber (1945 – 19 June 2019) was a Bangladeshi field hockey player and captain of Bangladesh men's national field hockey team. In recognition of his contribution in sports, he won the National Sports Awards in 1997.

Career
Saber was a member of the Pakistan men's national field hockey team in the 1970s. In 1971, he was one of the team members who represented Pakistan at the Barcelona World Cup. After the liberation of Bangladesh, he was included in the National Hockey team of Bangladesh. He was the captain of Bangladesh team at the Asia Games in 1979.

In addition to hockey, Saber was also a regular in football, cricket and basketball. He played for Abahani Limited Dhaka. He died on 19 June 2019 at the age of 74 at the Bangladesh Medical College Hospital in Dhaka.

References

1945 births
2019 deaths
Bangladeshi male field hockey players